Care New England (CNE) is a non-profit health system, comprising several hospitals in Rhode Island. Founding members Butler Hospital, Kent Hospital, and Women & Infants Hospital of Rhode Island formed CNE in February 1996. Based in Providence, Care New England serves the southeastern New England community, and many of its hospitals are teaching affiliates of The Warren Alpert Medical School of Brown University.

Current members of Care New England include:
 Butler Hospital
 Kent Hospital
 Memorial Hospital
 Women & Infants
 VNA of Care New England
 Care New England Wellness Center
 The Providence Center

In June 1999, Kent County Visiting Nurse Association became a member of the Care New England family, and later that year announced its name change to VNA of Care New England. In 2000, HealthTouch, Inc., a private duty nursing service, joined the division. In 2013, Memorial Hospital, a community hospital in Pawtucket, RI joined as well.

References

Hospital networks in the United States
Medical and health organizations based in Rhode Island